Oru Second Class Yathra is a 2015 Indian Malayalam-language comedy thriller drama film, written and directed by Jexson Antony and Rejis Antony in their debut film.

Plot
Police constables Balagopal and Jolly Kurien have been at odds for years but are under orders to transfer two prisoners Nandu and Maaran from Kannur to Trivandrum. They board the Parasuram express with the handcuffed inmates. While at the Kayamkulam station, Nandu escapes. The two officers get off the train at the next stop with Maaran and frantically searches for Nandu. The three unlikely musketeers finds the back-story of Nandu.

Nandu's father, Narayanan always have a wrongful intention to Nandu's sister, Lakshmi. Lakshmi is the daughter of Nandu's mother and her former husband, thus making her a half-sister. Lakshmi is not the daughter of Narayanan. Nandu, one day determines to kill his father for the same, but the trap he set accidentally killed his mother. He was arrested for his mother's murder. One day Narayanan comes to visit him at jail and reveals his true intentions for Lakshmi. Nandu determines to escape at any possible opportunities. The three musketeers finds Nandu while roughing with Narayanan, both with the intention to kill. Jolly accidentally kills  Narayanan. Knowing Narayanan's story, Maaran devises a plan to not let the issue known to others, to which everyone agrees. Narayanan's corpse is buried in a nearby church cemetery at that night itself. In the end of the day everyone is shown as happy in their karmic lives.

Cast

Reception

Critical response

The film met expectations. The Times of India wrote that the film "has a promising premise, but ends up being just half of what it aspires to be."

Now Running said that the film was neither damaging or offensive. Most of the film's scenes were shot inside a train and they gave it a road movie feel. The story starts when the train is in northern Kerala and ends in southern Kerala. The passengers on the train are shown as they affect the story.

International Business Times wrote that the film "fails to come out as a comedy suspense thriller as it was supposed to be". The directors, Jexon Antony and Rejis Antony, adopted a flash-back narrative, but "unfortunately the suspense elements went amiss, especially in the second half."  The first portion of the film offered promises which failed during its second half.

Indiaglitz noted that the slow story failed to meet the expectations of a thriller film. The first half of the film was alright, but the narrative flagging in the second half. It was felt that directors Jexson and Rejis Anthony did "okay on their first outing and a more polished movie is expected from them in future."  The project's cinematography by Vinod Illampally was praised. Since thrillers require a greater punching up during post-production, "the editing seems a bit lax."  The background score was fine, but in considering Gopi Sunder's body of work, it could have been better.  They summarized, writing the film has a novel theme, yet the execution could have been better. A bit more taut and crisp, with its first half- like narration in the second half too could have taken the movie far ahead. It is not a bad attempt and is very much a family movie and the subject of rape of a different nature is very relevant. Watch it without much expectation and you might be pleasantly surprised"

The Hindu felt writer/directors Jexson Antony and Rejis Antony tried to strike a proper balance between drama and comedy—juggling between the two modes would not wear down the audience. The Hindu felt this became evident in the film's second half, "where a scene of high tension and tragedy in the flashback cuts abruptly to a light-hearted one happening in the present."  It was however, concluded that "Barring a few humorous scenes, Oru Second Class Yathra does not make for a pleasant trip to the cinema."

Soundtrack
Music by: Gopi Sundar, Lyrics by: Hari Narayanan

 Ambazham Thanalitta - Vineeth Sreenivasan, Mridula Warrier

Accolades
Asianet Film Awards

 Performer of the Year - Vineeth Sreenivasan (for Various films)
 Best Villain - Nedumudi Venu (also for Rudra Simhasanam)

Kerala State Film Awards
 Kerala State Film Award – Special Mention for Joju George

Vanitha Film Awards

 Best Villain - Nedumudi Venu (also for Rudra Simhasanam)

References

External links
 Oru Second Class Yathra at the Internet Movie Database

2015 films
2010s Malayalam-language films
2010s comedy thriller films
Indian comedy thriller films
Films set in Kerala
2015 directorial debut films
2010s comedy road movies
Indian comedy road movies
Films shot in Kannur
Films shot in Alappuzha
Films shot in Thiruvananthapuram
2015 comedy films